The Iquiri Formation is an Eifelian to Frasnian geologic formation of central Bolivia. The formation comprises black shales and sandstones.

Fossil content 
The formation has provided fossils of Proteolobus walli.

See also 
 List of fossiliferous stratigraphic units in Bolivia

References

Further reading 
 G. D. Wood. 1997. The acritarch Proteolobus walli gen et sp. nov. from the Devonian Iquiri Formation of Bolivia: a possible coenobial alga. Micropaleontology 43(3):325-331

Geologic formations of Bolivia
Devonian System of South America
Devonian Bolivia
Eifelian Stage
Frasnian Stage
Shale formations
Sandstone formations
Devonian south paleopolar deposits
Formations